Jeffrey Mike Vlug (born 6 June 1986) is a Dutch former professional footballer. He played as a winger.

Vlug is a forward who was born in Woerden and made his debut in professional football, being part of the Sparta Rotterdam squad in the 2006–07 season. He would then play for a number of Dutch clubs, including Go Ahead Eagles and FC Eindhoven. 

In 2015, Vlug moved to Rijnsburgse Boys, but left again after six months. He later began playing for USV Hercules, where he was appointed team captain. Vlug decided to retire from football after the 2019–20 season, but as the Dutch competitions were cut short due to the COVID-19 pandemic, he officially retired on 3 April 2020.

References

1986 births
Living people
Dutch footballers
Sparta Rotterdam players
RBC Roosendaal players
Go Ahead Eagles players
FC Den Bosch players
Fortuna Sittard players
Eredivisie players
Eerste Divisie players
Derde Divisie players
People from Woerden
Association football wingers
USV Hercules players
Footballers from Utrecht (province)